Cub Island is an island in Box Elder County, Utah, Utah, United States.

Cub Island was so named on account of its smaller size to nearby Gunnison Island. During periods of lower water levels, Cub Island is connected to Gunnison Island by an exposed shoal.

References

Lake islands of Utah
Landforms of Box Elder County, Utah
Uninhabited islands of Utah
Great Salt Lake